The 2011–12 Penn Quakers men's basketball team represented the University of Pennsylvania during the 2011–12 NCAA Division I men's basketball season. The Quakers, led by third year head coach Jerome Allen, played their home games at The Palestra and are members of the Ivy League. They finished the season 20–13, 11–3 in Ivy League play to finish in second place. They were invited to the 2012 College Basketball Invitational where they defeated Quinnipiac in first round before falling in the quarterfinals to Butler.

Roster

Schedule

|-
!colspan=9 style=| Exhibition
 
|-
!colspan=9 style=| Regular Season

|-
!colspan=9 style=| CBI

Post season awards

All-Ivy
The following players earned Ivy League postseason recognition:
Player of the Year
^Zack Rosen, Penn (Sr., G, Colonia, N.J.)
 
First Team All-Ivy
^Zack Rosen, Penn (Sr., G, Colonia, N.J.)

Honorable Mention All-Ivy
Rob Belcore, Penn (Sr., G, Lake Forest, Ill.)
^Unanimous Selection

References

Penn Quakers men's basketball seasons
Penn
Penn
Penn Quakers
Penn Quakers